William Ledyard (December 6, 1738 – September 6, 1781) was a lieutenant colonel in the Connecticut militia who was killed during the American Revolutionary War. He commanded Fort Griswold in Groton and resisted the British forces during the Battle of Groton Heights on September 6, 1781. The British finally took the fort, and Ledyard surrendered—but the British officer took Ledyard's sword and used it to kill him in the very act of his surrender, then led the British forces to slaughter the surrendering Americans.

Early life
Ledyard was the son of John Ledyard, Esquire (1701-1771) and his wife Deborah who had come to America from England.  His parents lived their later years in Hartford, Connecticut.

Fort Griswold
Ledyard was in command of Fort Trumbull and Fort Griswold on September 6, 1781 when Fort Griswold fell to the British under Benedict Arnold in the Battle of Groton Heights. Ledyard had refused a British demand to surrender the fort, and he resisted the attack of a British force of 800 men led by Lieutenant Colonel Eyre, with 157 hastily collected and poorly armed militia inside Fort Griswold, according to accounts of the battle. This attack was made on three sides; there was a battery between the fort and the river, but the Americans could spare no men to work it. 

The British made their way into the fosse and scaled the works in the face of severe fire from the garrison. Eyre was wounded and died 12 hours afterward on shipboard, and his successor Major Montgomery was killed while mounting the parapet. The command passed to Tory Major Bromfield, who effected an entrance into the fort after nearly 200 of his men had been disabled, including 48 killed, the Americans having lost only about 12 men. The British then stormed the fort, and Ledyard ordered his men to cease firing and to lay down their arms. Bromfield demanded to know who commanded the fort.  Ledyard replied, "I did, sir, but you do now," and offered his sword. The British officer took the sword and stabbed Ledyard to death, initiating a massacre of some 80 surrendering Americans.

Arnold wrote the following account of the battle in a despatch to Henry Clinton two days afterward: "I have inclosed a return of the killed and wounded, by which your excellency will observe that our loss, though very considerable, is short of the enemy's, who lost most of their officers, among whom was their commander, Col. Ledyard. Eighty-five men were found dead in Fort Griswold, and sixty wounded, most of them mortally. Their loss on the opposite side (New London) must have been considerable, but cannot be ascertained."

Colonel Ledyard is buried in the Colonel Ledyard Cemetery in Groton.

Legacy
The town of Ledyard, Connecticut is named for Colonel Ledyard.  The town's high school football team is called the Ledyard Colonels, and a road in the town of Ledyard is named Colonel Ledyard Highway.

William Ledyard's nephew was noted explorer John Ledyard. The events of Fort Griswold and the subsequent death of Ledyard was depicted in Turn: Washington's Spies Season 4, Episode 10.

References

External links
Ledyard's service record from Francis B. Heitman's Historical Register of Officers of the Continental Army
 Sons of the American Revolution
 Joseph Duffy, "Connecticut At War", Connecticut Humanities Council
 Ledyard genealogy page (source for birthdate)
 Columbia Encyclopedia entry

1738 births
1781 deaths
Connecticut militiamen in the American Revolution
United States military personnel killed in the American Revolutionary War
People from Groton, Connecticut
Ledyard, Connecticut
People of colonial Connecticut
Deaths by stabbing in Connecticut